Hooja is a Swedish electronic music duo. Consisting of Hooja and DJ Mårdhund, the duos identities are unknown.

Discography

Singles

References

Swedish musical duos